Vitali Konstantinovich Lykhin (born 4 April 1980 in Moscow) is a former Russian football player.

References

1980 births
Footballers from Moscow
Living people
Russian footballers
FC Moscow players
Russian Premier League players
FC Sodovik Sterlitamak players
FC Torpedo Moscow players
Association football midfielders
FC Volga Ulyanovsk players